PFC Slavia Sofia (Bulgarian: ПФК Славия София) is a Bulgarian football club founded on 10 April 1913 in Sofia. Slavia's ground is Ovcha Kupel Stadium with a capacity of 25,556. The team's colours are white and black.

Competitions

A Group

League table

Results summary

Matches

External links
 Official website

PFC Slavia Sofia seasons
Slavia Sofia